Rashtriya Prajatantra Party (Nationalist) was a right-wing monarchist party in Nepal. It is a splinter group of the Rashtriya Prajatantra Party. The president of RPP (N) was Rajeshwor Devkota.

In November 1996 RPP (N) formed a front of 3 right-wing parties called Nationalist Democratic Front. It consisted of RPP (N), Nepal Yuva Sangathan, and Deshbhakta Prajatantrik Party. Devkota became the convenor of the front.

In January 2007, the party merged into the Rastriya Prajatantra Party Nepal.

References

Political parties in Nepal
Nepalese nationalism
Monarchist parties in Nepal